Julie Wright is an American softball coach who is the former head coach of Maryland.

Coaching career

Maryland
On July 17, 2015, Julie Wright was announced as the new head coach of the Maryland softball program. On August 7, Wright announced that she would be stepping down at Maryland as head coach after 4 seasons.

Head coaching record

College

References

Living people
Female sports coaches
American softball coaches
Ohio Bobcats softball coaches
Ohio Bobcats softball players
Kansas Jayhawks softball coaches
Akron Zips softball coaches
Wisconsin Badgers softball coaches
Idaho State Bengals softball coaches
Maryland Terrapins softball coaches
Year of birth missing (living people)